The table below details the complete World Championship Grand Prix results of the Formula One constructor Cooper between 1950 and 1969. It includes results from the works team as well as privately entered cars. Since the Constructors' Championship points were awarded to chassis-engine combinations rather than entrants, the table is sorted first by engine manufacturer then by entrant.

Complete Formula One World Championship results

(key)

Notes

Formula One constructor results